This is a list of football stadiums in England that are now defunct. Each stadium is shown alongside the year in which it ceased to be used and the stadium by which it was replaced.

Defunct stadiums

Stadiums no longer used for football
 Aigburth Cricket Ground
 Alexandra Meadows - Last used for football in 1881 by Blackburn Rovers. Remains in use for its original purpose of cricket.
 Christ Church Ground
 Clifton Grove
 County Cricket Ground, Derby
 County Cricket Ground, Northampton
 The Darlington Arena
 Dean Park Cricket Ground
 Herne Hill Velodrome -  FA Amateur Cup Final 1911 played there. Used by Crystal Palace F.C. between 1914–1918. Used now for cycling races although a football pitch is still available.
 Kennington Oval
 Nevill Ground — Last used for football in 1903. Remains in use for its original purpose of cricket.
 Trent Bridge — Last used for football in 1910 by Notts County. Remains in use for its original purpose of cricket.

See also
 List of football stadiums in England

Notes

External links
Goodbye Gay Meadow Book on Shrewsbury Town's old ground, Gay Meadow
BBC Webpage on: Farewell Milton Road

defunct
 
Football, England